The Wayland E. Poole House is a historic home located near Auburn, Wake County, North Carolina, a small, unincorporated community located to the east of Garner. Built in 1911, the house is a Queen Anne cross-gabled frame building with a wraparound porch.

In September 2003, the Wayland E. Poole House was listed on the National Register of Historic Places.

See also
List of Registered Historic Places in North Carolina

References

Houses on the National Register of Historic Places in North Carolina
Houses completed in 1911
Queen Anne architecture in North Carolina
Houses in Wake County, North Carolina
National Register of Historic Places in Wake County, North Carolina